Rashard Jamal Mendenhall (born June 19, 1987) is a former American football running back and current television writer who played in the National Football League (NFL) for six seasons. He played college football at Illinois and was drafted by the Pittsburgh Steelers in the first round of the 2008 NFL Draft. He won Super Bowl XLIII with the Steelers against the Arizona Cardinals, for whom he later played one season.

Early years
Mendenhall attended Niles West High School and Lincoln Jr. High School in Skokie, Illinois. As a five-star prospect, he was also rated the best recruit in the state of Illinois by Scout.com. He recorded 1,300 yards and 21 touchdowns as a sophomore. As a junior, he rushed for 1,832 yards and 19 touchdowns, while averaging 11.6 yards per carry. In his last year, he averaged 9.1 yards per carry, rushing for 1,453 yards on 160 attempts and 14 touchdowns.  Following his high school career, Mendenhall played in the 2005 U.S. Army All-American Bowl.

College career
Mendenhall played for the University of Illinois football team. His first season was in 2005, during which he rushed for 218 yards on 48 carries, adding 82 yards receiving and two touchdowns. In 2006, Mendenhall nearly tripled his rushing total, gaining 640 yards and scoring five touchdowns. He added 164 yards receiving and a touchdown, with 12 receptions. Throughout his final season with the Illini, Mendenhall rushed for a then school record 1,681 yards and 17 touchdowns. Throughout the 13 game season, he also had 318 yards receiving and two touchdowns on 34 receptions. He majored in Sports Management.

Mendenhall was on the cover of Sporting News' High School Football Magazine. On April 24, 2008, Mendenhall made a guest appearance on The Best Damn Sports Show Period in a segment called Best Damn Rookie Hazing, along with former Oklahoma wide receiver Malcolm Kelly.

Statistics

Professional career

Pittsburgh Steelers (2008–2012)
Mendenhall was drafted 23rd overall by the Pittsburgh Steelers in the 2008 NFL Draft. Prior to his rookie season Mendenhall was ranked by ESPN as the 30th best running back in the league. On July 25, 2008, Mendenhall agreed to a five-year contract worth US$12.55 million with the Steelers, of which $7.125 million is guaranteed. He was expected to be a complement to Pro-Bowl running back Willie Parker, in addition to returning kicks. Mendenhall fumbled twice in Pittsburgh's third pre-season game against Minnesota; they were attributed to adjusting to the faster pace of the NFL. Days after the game, teammate Hines Ward placed a ball in Mendenhall's locker with a note stating, "Take Mendenhall's ball away and get $100 from him." Mendenhall was required to carry the ball everywhere he went until the team's next game. Mendenhall fumbled once more in the Steelers final pre-season game, but worked with running backs coach Kirby Wilson to fix the problem.

Mendenhall entered the 2008 regular season as the Steelers' youngest player. He took on return duties in addition to his running back position. Entering the fourth week of the 2008 season, Willie Parker suffered an injury which allowed Mendenhall to make his first NFL start. Mendenhall rushed for 30 yards on 9 carries, but was forced to leave the game with a fractured shoulder in the third quarter after a hit by Baltimore Ravens linebacker Ray Lewis. Mendenhall was placed on injured reserve for the remainder of the season. Mendenhall finished his rookie season with 58 rushing yards on 19 carries and 115 yards on six kick returns.

In week 4 of the 2009 season, Mendenhall started in place of an injured Willie Parker. Against the San Diego Chargers, he jump-started his NFL career by rushing for 165 yards and two touchdowns.

After a 2009 season where Mendenhall ran for 1,108 yards and 7 touchdowns, his 2010 season proved to be even more impressive. In 2010 Mendenhall ran for 1,273 yards and 13 touchdowns, helping lead the Steelers back to the Super Bowl against the Green Bay Packers, which they subsequently lost. The loss was aided by a 4th quarter fumble by Mendenhall that led to a Packers scoring drive.

The 2011 season was a difficult season for Mendenhall, who only rushed for over 100 yards two times in 15 games. However, Mendenhall scored 9 touchdowns and had a 4.0 yards per carry average. On January 1, 2012, Mendenhall left the last regular season game against the Cleveland Browns with a knee injury on the final play of the 1st quarter. It was soon discovered that he had torn his ACL and was placed on the IR list. Mendenhall finished the year with 928 yards rushing.

On December 12, 2012, Mendenhall was suspended by the Steelers organization for a game against the Dallas Cowboys for not showing up to a game against the San Diego Chargers because he was deactivated due to inconsistent play.

Arizona Cardinals (2013)
Mendenhall signed a one-year contract worth up to $2.5 million with the Arizona Cardinals on March 13, 2013. Mendenhall would end up scoring eight rushing touchdowns for the Cardinals

Retirement 
In March 2014, at the age of 26, Mendenhall retired from the NFL, saying, "Football was pretty cool, but I don't want to play anymore. I want to travel the world and write!  ".

NFL career statistics

Writing career
Mendenhall was a writer and story editor for the HBO sports comedy Ballers.  A number of scenes from the show were inspired by his own career.

Personal

Osama bin Laden tweet
Reacting to the death of Osama bin Laden and the American reaction to the death of Osama bin Laden on May 2, 2011, Mendenhall posted comments on his Twitter account criticizing the celebrations; one tweet seemed to support 9/11 conspiracy theories.

More Tweets
On April 11, 2019, during the public fallout between Mendenhall's former teammates Steelers quarterback Ben Roethlisberger and former Steelers wide receiver Antonio Brown, Mendenhall took to Twitter stating that the situation between Roethlisberger and Brown occurred because Roethlisberger is racist.  Mendenhall tweeted, "Alright, I'll end the mystery...B's racist and @AB84 (Brown) is black. He had to catch balls from a racist quarterback. Every honest player knows it, it's not a big deal. He was just supposed to take his lickings and move on, like a slave for real." Mendenhall later attempted to back pedal on his remarks, saying that Roethlisberger was "not racist" just like Brown is "not a dirtbag" and "Clearly it's no fun, when EVERYONE's the accused."

Transition from Football
Mendenall described the transition of leaving football as "finding a new identity" and "leaving the warrior that lived for physical battle." He adopted a meditative discipline he described as "crescent moon" to facilitate his adjustment to post-football life.

References

External links

Illinois Fighting Illini bio

1987 births
Living people
African-American players of American football
American football running backs
Arizona Cardinals players
Illinois Fighting Illini football players
People from Skokie, Illinois
Pittsburgh Steelers players
Players of American football from Illinois
Sportspeople from Cook County, Illinois
Writers from Illinois
21st-century African-American sportspeople
20th-century African-American people